This is a list of civil parishes in the ceremonial county of Essex, England. There are 307 civil parishes.
The former Thurrock Urban District, Benfleet Urban District, Chelmsford Municipal Borough, Harlow Urban District and Clacton Urban District are unparished. Parts of the former Basildon Urban District, Braintree and Bocking Urban District, Brentwood Urban District, Colchester Municipal Borough and Southend-on-Sea County Borough are also unparished. Population figures are not available for some of the smallest parishes.

*Salcott, Virley, Peldon, Great and Little Wigborough are governed by the joint Winstred Hundred Parish Council.

**Abberton and Langenhoe are governed by the joint Abberton and Langenhoe Parish Council.

See also
 List of civil parishes in England
 The Hundred Parishes - a grouping of parishes in NW Essex, NE Herts and southern Cambridgeshire

References

External links
 Office for National Statistics : Geographical Area Listings
 Map of the Essex parishes (2010)

 
Civil parishes
Essex
Civil parishes